Electoral history of Lyndon B. Johnson, who served as the 36th president of the United States (1963–1969), the 37th vice president (1961–1963); and as a United States senator (1949–1961) and United States representative (1937–1949) from Texas.

Texas's 10th congressional district special election, 1937
Lyndon B. Johnson (D) - 8,280 (27.65%)
 Merton Harris (D) - 5,111 (17.07%)
 Polk Shelton (D) - 4,420 (14.76%)
 Sam V. Stone (D) - 4,048 (13.52%)
 C. N. Avery (D) - 3,951 (13.19%)
 Houghton Brownlee (D) - 3,019 (10.08%)
 Ayers Ross (D) - 1,088 (3.63%)

Texas's 10th congressional district election, 1938
unopposed

Texas's 10th congressional district election, 1940
unopposed

Texas United States Senate special election, 1941:
 W. Lee O'Daniel (D) - 175,590 (30.49%)
 Lyndon B. Johnson (D) - 174,279 (30.26%)
 Gerald C. Mann (D) - 140,807 (24.45%)
 Martin Dies, Jr. (D) - 80,653 (14.01%)
 Samuel N. Morris (D) - 1,654 (0.29%)
 Joe Thompson (D) - 429 (0.07%)
 Politte Elvins (R) - 273 (0.05%)
 W. R. Jones (I) - 257 (0.05%)
 Joseph C. Bean (D) - 242 (0.04%)
 W. W. King (D) - 238 (0.04%)
 Arlon Davis (D) - 174 (0.03%)
 Guy B. Fisher (D) - 141 (0.02%)
 John C. Williams (D) - 128 (0.02%)
 W. E. Gilliland (D) - 96 (0.02%)
 Starl G. Newsome, Jr. (D) - 96 (0.02%)
 A. E. Calvin (D) - 94 (0.02%)
 Basil Muse Hatfield (D) - 83 (0.01%)
 Bubba Hicks (D) - 77 (0.01%)
 Enoch Fletcher (R) - 71 (0.01%)
 W. C. Welch (D) - 69 (0.01%)
 Floyd E. Ryan (D) - 61 (0.01%)
 Walter A. Schultz (D) - 61 (0.01%)
 A. E. Harding (D)  - 59 (0.01%)
 Robert Grammer Head (D) - 58 (0.01%)
 Homer Brooks (Communist) - 52 (0.01%)
 O. F. Health, Sr. (D) - 51 (0.01%)
 John Romulus Brinkley (D) - 36 (0.01%)
 Edwin Waller III (D) - 28 (0.01%)
 Charles L. Somerville (D) - 20 (0.00%)

Texas's 10th congressional district election, 1942
unopposed

Texas's 10th congressional district election, 1944
Primary election (July 22, 1944) 
 Lyndon B. Johnson (D) - 20, 592 (68.30%)
 Buck Taylor (D) - 9,723 (31.69%)

General election (November 7, 1944)
unopposed

Texas's 10th congressional district election, 1946
 Primary election (July 27, 1946)
 Lyndon B. Johnson (D) - 34,712 (68.52%)
 Hardy Hollers (D) - 14,231 (28.09%)
 Charles E. King (D) - 1,714 (3.38%)

 General election (November 5, 1946)
unopposed

Texas United States Senate election, 1948 (Democratic primary):
 Coke Stevenson - 477,077 (39.68%)
 Lyndon B. Johnson - 405,617 (33.73%)
 George Peddy - 237,195 (19.73%)

Texas United States Senate election, 1948 (Democratic primary runoff):
 Lyndon B. Johnson - 494,191 (50.00%)
 Coke Stevenson - 494,104 (50.00%)

Texas United States Senate election, 1948:
 Lyndon B. Johnson (D) - 702,985 (66.22%)
 Jack Porter (R) - 349,665 (32.94%)
 Samuel N. Morris (Prohibition) - 8,913 (0.84%)

Texas United States Senate election, 1954:
 Lyndon B. Johnson (D) (inc.) - 538,417 (84.59%)
 Carlos G. Watson (R) - 95,033 (14.93%)
 Fred T. Spangler (Constitution) - 3,025 (0.48%)

1956 Democratic National Convention (Presidential tally):
 Adlai Stevenson - 906 (65.89%)
 W. Averell Harriman - 210 (15.27%)
 Lyndon B. Johnson - 80 (5.82%)
 Stuart Symington - 46 (3.35%)
 Happy Chandler - 37 (2.69%)
 John S. Battle - 33 (2.40%)
 James C. Davis - 33 (2.40%)
 George Bell Timmerman - 24 (1.75%)
 Frank J. Lausche - 6 (0.44%)

1956 Democratic National Convention (Vice Presidential tally):

First ballot:
 Estes Kefauver - 466.5
 John F. Kennedy - 294.5
 Albert Gore, Sr. - 178
 Robert F. Wagner, Jr. - 162.5
 Hubert Humphrey - 134
 Luther Hodges - 40
 P. T. Maner - 33
 LeRoy Collins - 29
 Clinton Anderson - 16
 Frank G. Clement - 14
 Pat Brown - 1
 Lyndon B. Johnson - 1
 Stuart Symington - 1

1960 Democratic National Convention (Presidential tally):
 John F. Kennedy - 806 (52.89%)
 Lyndon B. Johnson - 409 (26.84%)
 Stuart Symington - 86 (5.64%)
 Adlai Stevenson II - 80 (5.25%)
 Robert Meyner - 43 (2.82%)
 Hubert Humphrey - 42 (2.76%)
 George Smathers - 30 (1.97%)
 Ross Barnett - 23 (1.51%)
 Herschel C. Loveless - 2 (0.13%)
 Pat Brown - 1 (0.07%)
 Orval E. Faubus - 1 (0.07%)
 Albert Rosellini - 1 (0.07%)

1960 Democratic National Convention (Vice Presidential tally):
 Lyndon B. Johnson - 1,521 (100.00%)

1960 United States presidential election:
 John F. Kennedy/Lyndon B. Johnson (D) - 34,220,984 (49.7%) and 303 electoral votes (22 states carried)
 Richard Nixon/Henry Cabot Lodge, Jr. (R) - 34,108,157 (49.5%) and 219 electoral votes (26 states carried)
 Harry F. Byrd/Strom Thurmond (I) - 286,359 (0.4%) and 14 electoral votes (2 states carried)
 Harry F. Byrd/Barry Goldwater (I) - 1 electoral vote (Oklahoma faithless elector)
 Orval E. Faubus/James G. Crommelin (States' Rights) - 44,984 (0.1%)

Texas United States Senate election, 1960:
 Lyndon B. Johnson (D) (inc.) - 1,306,625 (57.98%)
 John Tower (R) - 926,653 (41.12%)
 Bard A. Logan (Constitution) - 20,506 (0.91%)

1964 Democratic presidential primaries:
 Pat Brown - 1,693,813 (27.26%)
 Lyndon B. Johnson (inc.) - 1,106,999 (17.82%)
 Sam Yorty - 798,431 (12.85%)
 George Wallace - 798,431 (12.85%)
 John W. Reynolds - 522,405 (8.41%)
 Albert S. Porter - 493,619 (7.94%)
 Matthew E. Welsh - 376,023 (6.05%)
 Daniel Brewster - 267,106 (4.30%)
 Jennings Randolph - 131,432 (2.12%)
 Unpledged - 81,614 (1.31%)
 Robert F. Kennedy - 36,258 (0.58%)
 Lar Daly - 15,160 (0.24%)
 Henry Cabot Lodge, Jr. - 8,495 (0.14%)
 Albert J. Easter - 8,275 (0.13%)
 Adlai Stevenson II - 800 (0.01%)
 Hubert Humphrey - 548 (0.01%)

1964 Democratic National Convention (Presidential tally):
 Lyndon B. Johnson (inc.) - 2,316 (100.00%)

1964 United States presidential election:
 Lyndon B. Johnson/Hubert Humphrey (D) - 43,127,041 (61.1%) and 486 electoral votes (44 states and D.C. carried)
 Barry Goldwater/William E. Miller (R) - 27,175,754 (38.5%) and 52 electoral votes (6 states carried)

1968 Democratic presidential primaries:
 Eugene McCarthy - 2,914,933 (38.73%)
 Robert F. Kennedy - 2,305,148 (30.63%)
 Stephen M. Young - 549,140 (7.30%)
 Lyndon B. Johnson (inc.)  - 383,590 (5.10%)
 Thomas C. Lynch - 380,286 (5.05%)
 Roger D. Branigin - 238,700 (3.17%)
 George Smathers - 236,242 (3.14%)
 Hubert Humphrey - 166,463 (2.21%) 	
 Unpledged - 161,143 (2.14%)
 Scott Kelly - 128,899 (1.71%)
 George Wallace - 34,489 (0.46%)
 Richard Nixon (write-in) - 13,610 (0.18%)
 Ronald Reagan (write-in) - 5,309 (0.07%)
 Ted Kennedy - 4,052 (0.05%)
 Paul C. Fisher - 506 (0.01%)
 John G. Crommelin - 186 (0.00%)

Notes

References

Lyndon B. Johnson
Johnson, Lyndon Baines
Johnson, Lyndon Baines